Mark Pollicott (born 24 September 1959) is a British mathematician known for his contributions to ergodic theory and dynamical systems.   He has a particular interest in applications to other areas of mathematics, including geometry, number theory and analysis. 
 
Pollicott attended High Pavement College in Nottingham, where his teachers included the Booker prize winning author Stanley Middleton. He gained a BSc in  Mathematics and Physics in 1981 and a PhD in mathematics in 1984 both at the University of Warwick. His PhD supervisor was Bill Parry and his thesis title The Ruelle Operator, Zeta Functions and the Asymptotic Distribution of Closed Orbits.
 
He  held permanent positions at the University of Edinburgh, University of Porto, and University of Warwick before appointment to the Fielden Chair of Pure Mathematics at the University of Manchester (1996–2004). He then returned to a professorship at Warwick  in  2005. In addition, he has held numerous visiting positions including ones at the Institut des Hautes Études Scientifiques in Paris, the Institute for Advanced Study in Princeton, MSRI at the University of California, Berkeley, Caltech, and the University of Grenoble. He has been recipient of a Royal Society University Research Fellowship, two Leverhulme Trust Senior Research Fellowships and an E.U. Marie Curie Chair.

References

External links
Home page at Warwick

Living people
20th-century British mathematicians
21st-century British mathematicians
Dynamical systems theorists
Alumni of the University of Warwick
Academics of the University of Warwick
Academics of the University of Manchester
1959 births
Scientists from Nottingham